Protohermes is a genus of dobsonflies in the family Corydalidae. Protohermes is the most specious and  widely distributed genus within Megaloptera, but up to 85% of species are restricted to small endemic areas in Asia. This endemism may be a result of an association with high elevation and high slope streams in Northern Vietnam and China.

Description 
Adult Protohermes generally have yellow coloration with white spots on the wings. The male genetalia region is diverse across the genus and can be useful for species-level identification, especially the shape and size of the tenth tergum and the subgenital plate at the ninth sternum. Nuptial gifts in Protohermes may as large as 20% of the total body mass of the male and can require up to 2 days to recover before mating again.

The size and phenology of larvae is closely tied to the availability of different sizes of prey. Dwarfism occurs in populations on islands and peninsulas as a result of fewer species of large prey, and maturation may be synchronous with prey in locations with seasonal variability. Larger larvae do not consume smaller prey, and they actively select prey as an ambush predator. Larvae are motionless 90% of the time during the day, but do change position on the stream bed during the night.

Taxonomy 
Protohermes contains the following species:

 Protohermes costalis species-group
 Protohermes acutatus
 Protohermes costalis
 Protohermes basiflavus
 Protohermes disjunctus
 Protohermes lii
 Protohermes yunnanensis
 Protohermes arunachalensis
 Protohermes fujianensis
 Protohermes hunanensis
 Protohermes yangi
 Protohermes gutianensis
 Protohermes orientalis
 Protohermes similis
 Protohermes triangulatus
 Protohermes sinensis
 Protohermes basimaculatus
 Protohermes stigmosus
 Protohermes niger
 Protohermes changninganus species-group
 Protohermes subnubilus
 Protohermes decemmaculatus
 Protohermes changninganus
 Protohermes albipennis
 Protohermes xingshanensis
 Protohermes tengchongensis
 Protohermes latus
 Protohermes sublunatus
 Protohermes davidi
 Protohermes guangxiensis
 Protohermes impunctatus
 Protohermes sichuanensis
 Protohermes motuoensis
 Protohermes piaoacanus
 Protohermes sonus
 Protohermes zhuae
 Protohermes decolor
 Protohermes sabahensis
 Protohermes fruhstorferi
 Protohermes spectabilis
 Protohermes immaculatus
 Protohermes assamensis
 Protohermes differentialis
 Protohermes cavaleriei
 Protohermes dimaculatus
 Protohermes furcatus
 Protohermes xanthodes
 Protohermes infectus
 Protohermes burmanus
 Protohermes karubei
 Protohermes chebalingensis
 Protohermes congruens
 Protohermes curvicornis
 Protohermes dulongjiangensis
 Protohermes flavinervus
 Protohermes flinti
 Protohermes goodgeri
 Protohermes ohli
 Protohermes tenellus
 Protohermes owadai
 Protohermes pennyi
 Protohermes stangei
 Protohermes subparcus
 Protohermes tortuosus
 Protohermes ishizukai
 Protohermes sinuolatus
 Protohermes hainanensis
 Protohermes horni
 Protohermes hubeiensis
 Protohermes axillatus
 Protohermes festivus
 Protohermes montanus
 Protohermes flavipennis
 Protohermes bellulus
 Protohermes cangyuanensis
 Protohermes parcus
 Protohermes striatulus
 Protohermes concolorus
 Protohermes uniformis
 Protohermes vitalisi
 Protohermes walkeri
 Protohermes weelei
 Protohermes grandis
 Protohermes dichrous

References 

Corydalidae
Insects of Vietnam
Insects described in 1907